Aleksandar Colovic is a professional chess player, holding the Grandmaster title. In 2016 Colovic was elected as a General Secretary of the Association of Chess Professionals and in 2019 he was elected as a president of the same association.

Personal life 
Colovic was born in Skopje in 1976, and holds a BA in English Language and Literature.
He speaks English, Spanish, Italian, Russian, Macedonian, Serbian and Bulgarian language.

He has one sister, biologist Ana Colovic Lesoska.

Chess career 
Colovic won the Malaga Open in 2005. He participated in 3 Chess Olympiads and 2 European Team Championships. He has also won 18 national team titles in Macedonia, and scored the best result (according to percentage) on board 4 with 5.5 out of 7 at the European Club Cup in 2015 in Skopje, and had the best result on the Macedonian team (7 out of 10) at the 42nd Chess Olympiad.

Colovic has also worked as a chess coach, with his student, Marina Brunello, winning a gold medal at the 43rd Chess Olympiad. In 2017, with Colovic coaching the Macedonian women national team, the team came in 20th place at the European Team Chess Championship in Crete.

References

External links

Aleksandar Colovic chess games at 365Chess.com

Chess grandmasters
People from Macedonia (region)
Year of birth missing (living people)
Living people
Macedonian chess players